Bathytoma gabrielae is a species of sea snail, a marine gastropod mollusk in the family Borsoniidae.

Description
The size of an adult shell varies between 30 mm and 50 mm.

Distribution
This species occurs in the Indian Ocean off Tanzania and Mozambique.

References

External links
 

gabrielae
Gastropods described in 2006